Synecdoche is a type of metonymy: it is a figure of speech in which a term for a part of something is used to refer to the whole (pars pro toto), or vice versa (totum pro parte). The term is derived from the Greek .

Examples of common English synecdoches include suits for businessmen, wheels for automobile, and boots for soldiers.
Another example is the use of government buildings to refer to their resident agencies or bodies, such as “The Pentagon” for the United States Department of Defense. An example from British English is using "Downing Street" as a metonym for "the Office of the Prime Minister".

Definition

Synecdoche is a rhetorical trope and a kind of metonymy—a figure of speech using a term to denote one thing to refer to a related thing.

Synecdoche (and thus metonymy) is distinct from metaphor, although in the past, it was considered to be a sub-species of metaphor, intending metaphor as a type of conceptual substitution (as Quintilian does in  Book VIII). In Lanham's Handlist of Rhetorical Terms, the three terms possess somewhat restrictive definitions in tune with their etymologies from Greek:
 Metaphor: changing a word from its literal meaning to one not properly applicable but analogous to it; assertion of identity—rather than likeness as with simile.
 Metonymy: substitution of cause for effect, proper name for one of its qualities.

Classification
Synecdoche is often used as a type of personification by attaching a human aspect to a nonhuman thing. It is used in reference to political relations, including "having a footing", to mean a country or organization is in a position to act, or "the wrong hands", to describe opposing groups, usually in the context of military power.

The two main types of synecdoche are microcosm and macrocosm. A microcosm uses a part of something to refer to the entirety. An example of this is saying "I need a hand" with a project, but needing the entire person. A macrocosm is the opposite, using the name of the entire structure of something to refer to a small part. An example of this is saying "the world" while referring to a certain country or part of the planet.
The figure of speech is divided into the image (what the speaker uses to refer to something) and the subject (what is referred to).

In politics, the residence or location of an executive can be used to represent the office itself.  For example, "the  White House" can mean the Executive Office of the President of the United States;  "Buckingham Palace" can mean the crown of the United Kingdom; "the Sublime Porte" can mean the Ottoman Empire; and "the Kremlin" can mean the government of Russia. The Élysée Palace might indicate the President of the French Republic.

Sonnets and other forms of love poetry frequently use synecdoches to characterize the beloved in terms of individual body parts rather than a coherent whole. This practice is especially common in the Petrarchan sonnet, where the idealised beloved is often described part by part, head-to-toe.

Synecdoche is also popular in advertising. Since synecdoche uses a part to represent a whole, its use requires the audience to make associations and "fill in the gaps", engaging with the ad by thinking about the product. Moreover, catching the attention of an audience with advertising is often referred to by advertisers with the synedoche "getting eyeballs".
Synecdoche is common in spoken English, especially in reference to sports. The names of cities are used as shorthand for their sports teams to describe events and their outcomes, such as "Denver won Monday's game", while accuracy would require a sports team from the city won the game.

Kenneth Burke (1945), an American literary theorist, declared that in rhetoric, the four master tropes, or figures of speech, are metaphor, metonymy, synecdoche, and irony. Burke's primary concern with these four master tropes is more than simply their figurative usage, but includes their role in the discovery and description of the truth. He described synecdoche as "part of the whole, whole for the part, container for the contained, sign for the thing signified, material for the thing made… cause for the effect, effect for the cause, genus for the species, species for the genus". In addition, Burke suggests synecdoche patterns can include reversible pairs such as disease-cure. Burke proclaimed the noblest synecdoche is found in the description of "microcosm and macrocosm" since microcosm is related to macrocosm as part to the whole, and either the whole can represent the part or the part can represent the whole". Burke compares synecdoche with the concept of "representation", especially in the political sense in which elected representatives stand in pars pro toto for their electorate.

Examples

Part referring to whole (pars pro toto)
 Referring to a person according to a single characteristic: "gray beard" meaning an old man 
 Referring to a sword as a "blade"
 Describing a complete vehicle as "wheels", or, referring to a manual transmission vehicle as a "stick"

General class name that denotes a specific member of that or an associated class
 Referring to a species of an organism or virus by the name of one of its hierarchical groups, e.g. “Coronavirus is rampant throughout the city.”
 "I was interviewed by the New York Times."
 "The government made a statement on the issue yesterday."

Specific class name referring to general set of associated things
 "John Hancock" (used in the United States), for the signature of any person
 "Carbon" for the entire basket of greenhouse gases, as a shorthand derived from carbon dioxide, the most common such gas
 A genericized trademark, for example "Coke" for any variety of cola (or for any variety of soft drink, as in the southern United States), "Kleenex" for facial tissues, "Vaseline" for petroleum jelly, "Band-Aid" (in the United States) for any variety of adhesive bandage, "Tide" for any variety of laundry detergent, "Hoover" (in the UK) for any variety of vacuum cleaner, or "Styrofoam" for any product made of expanded polystyrene.

Referring to material actually or supposedly used to make something
 "brass" for brass instruments, or the shell casings of bullet cartridges, or the medals and stars of high ranking military officers
 "lead" for bullets, lead being the most common material for making bullets
 "cement" for concrete, cement being just the binder in concrete

Container refers to its contents
 "barrel" for a barrel of oil
 "keg" for a keg of beer
 "She drank the cup", to refer to her drinking of the cup's contents

See also

 Antonomasia
 Bahuvrihi
 Conceptual metaphor
 Hendiadys
 Holonymy
 Hyponymy
 Merism
 Meronymy
 Faulty generalization
 Fallacy of division
 Symbol

Notes

References

Further reading

External links

 Synecdoche from Silva Rhetoricæ: The Forest of Rhetoric

 
Figures of speech
Rhetoric
Tropes by type